is a Shinto technical term that indicates both the process of dividing a Shinto kami to be re-enshrined somewhere else (such as a house's kamidana), and the spirit itself produced by the division.

For details, see the article about the similar term Kanjō.

References

Traditional rituals of East Asia
Shinto
Shinto terminology